Anastasiia Manievska (born 9 September 1998 in Zaporizhzhia Oblast, Ukraine) is a Ukrainian weightlifter. She won silver medal at the 2022 European Championships in Tirana, Albania, finishing second behind Solfrid Koanda from Norway.

Manievska graduated from Zaporizhzhia National University.

Major results

References

External links 
 

Living people
1998 births
Sportspeople from Zaporizhzhia Oblast
Ukrainian female weightlifters
European Weightlifting Championships medalists
21st-century Ukrainian women